The EMBO Journal is a semi-monthly peer-reviewed scientific journal focusing on full-length papers describing original research of general interest in molecular biology and related areas. The editor-in-chief is Facundo D. Batista (Harvard Medical School).

History
The journal was established in 1982 and was published by Nature Publishing Group on behalf of the European Molecular Biology Organization until the launch of EMBO Press in 2013.

Abstracting and indexing
The journal is abstracted and indexed in:

According to the Journal Citation Reports, the journal has a 2021 impact factor of 13.783.

See also
EMBO Reports
Molecular Systems Biology

References

External links

 (1986–2003 issues from microfilm)

Molecular and cellular biology journals
Semi-monthly journals
Publications established in 1982
English-language journals
Delayed open access journals
European Molecular Biology Organization academic journals